Felix Ashton Ellis (born 22 January 1990) is an Australian politician, who was elected to the Tasmanian House of Assembly on 17 August 2020 in a recount to fill a vacancy for the division of Braddon. A member of the  Liberal Party, Ellis is a member of the Rockliff ministry, serving as Minister for Police, Fire and Emergency Management, Resources, and Skills, Training and Workforce Growth.

Early life and education 
Ellis was born in Brisbane and raised in Western Australia, including in remote aboriginal communities. Ellis graduated from Hale School in 2007 before completing an apprenticeship in plumbing and gas fitting with the family business.

He moved to Tasmania in 2014 after his mother had moved there earlier, and worked as a plumber on Tasmania's West Coast.

Political career 
Ellis was an unsuccessful Liberal candidate for Braddon at the 2018 Tasmanian state election, before being elected on countback caused by the resignation of Joan Rylah in August 2020.

Following the 2018 state election, there was speculation that Ellis was considering running for federal parliament however, he was ineligible for the 2018 Braddon by-election as he maintains dual Australian and Lithuanian citizenship.

Ellis was widely praised for his maiden speech which detailed his family's journey from the ruins of Lithuania following World War II, to ultimately, settling in Tasmania.

At the 2021 election, Ellis received the second highest first preference vote of all Braddon's 21 candidates, although he was unable to hold his seat on preferences. However, Ellis was re-elected in a countback following the resignation of Adam Brooks immediately after the poll.

Since his election, Ellis has been widely criticised by the Australian Greens and Bob Brown Foundation for his support of the mining and forestry industries in Tasmania. Ellis has been a vocal supporter of the Tasmanian Government's workplace protection legislation saying, "It is completely unacceptable for workers at Venture Minerals' Riley Mine to come to work to find they can't get on site because greenies are chained to the front gates and machinery."

Ellis caused a significant controversy in the final days of the 2021 election campaign when the global vegan community voiced criticism of him after he posted to social media a photo of himself eating a burger with the caption "Allergies: vegan food ...".

In September 2021, Ellis used a speech in parliament to criticise Tasmanian Greens Leader Cassy O'Connor after she claimed the Australian Prime Minister Scott Morrison was part of a 'death cult''', referring to his membership of a Pentecostal church. Ellis said O'Connor's comments were "a sad reflection of a creeping, hateful, anti-Christian intolerance".

Ellis voted against legislation to legalise euthanasia in March 2021, stating in an opinion editorial that "If we cannot yet create a system that cares which is free from abuse, I cannot see how we can create a system that kills which is free from abuse."'' Ellis was one of only six MPs to vote against the legislation.

On 28 February 2022, Ellis was promoted to Parliamentary Secretary to the Premier, and Government Whip.

Following the resignation of Jacquie Petrusma, Ellis was elevated to the Ministry on 27 July 2022. Ellis was appointed as Minister for Police, Fire and Emergency Management, Resources, and Skills, Training and Workforce Growth.

Personal life 
Ellis is married to former ABC Landline journalist Margot Kelly. and they have one son.

References

External links
 

1990 births
Living people
Members of the Tasmanian House of Assembly
Liberal Party of Australia members of the Parliament of Tasmania
21st-century Australian politicians
Australian people of Lithuanian descent